Tetraconodontinae is an extinct subfamily of the pig family (Suidae). Fossils have been found in Africa and Asia.

References

Fossilworks Tetraconodontinae

Prehistoric Suidae